Many units of the United States Armed Forces have distinctive mottoes. Such mottoes are used in order to "reflect and reinforce" each unit's values and traditions. Mottoes are used by both military branches and smaller units. While some mottoes are official, others are unofficial. Some appear on unit patches, such as the U.S. Army's distinctive unit insignia.

The use of mottoes is as old as the U.S. military itself. A general order issued by George Washington on February 20, 1776, when he was commander-in-chief of the Continental Army, directed that "it is necessary that every Regiment should be furnished with Colours" and the "Number of the Regiment is to be mark'd on the Colours, and such a Motto, as the Colonel may choose, in fixing upon which, the General advises a Consultation amongst them."

United States Army

Major Commands
United States Army - This We'll Defend
School of Military Packaging Technology (formerly Joint Military Packaging Training Center) - To Preserve and Protect
Joint Multinational Readiness Center - Train to Win
Joint Readiness Training Center - Forging the Warrior Spirit
Joint Security Area, United Nations Command - Panmunjom (JSA) -In Front Of Them All
Army Judge Advocate General's Corps - 1775
United States Army Legal Services Agency - 
Army Criminal Investigation Command - Do What Has to Be Done
Army Materiel Command - Arsenal for the Brave
Headquarters, Military District of Washington - 
Military Traffic Management Command - Serving the Armed Forces
National Training Center - Lead Train Win
Northern Warfare Training Center - 
United States Military Academy (West Point) - Duty, Honor, Country (adopted 1898)
United States Army Special Forces (Green Berets) - 
Army Medical Department - To Conserve Fighting Strength
United States Army Military Police Corps - Assist. Protect. Defend.

Adjutant general
Adjutant General's Corps - Defend and Serve
4th Adjutant General Battalion - High Above the Rest
6th Adjutant General Battalion - Train Defend Serve
14th Adjutant General Battalion - Victory Through Excellence
30th Adjutant General Battalion - Meeting the Challenge
39th Adjutant General Battalion - Excellence Starts Here
42d Adjutant General Battalion - Impolite Militem (Start the Soldier)
43d Adjutant General Battalion - Soldiers for Freedom
46th Adjutant General Battalion - Begin with the Best
67th Adjutant General Battalion - Prepared and Able
95th Adjutant General Battalion - Soldiering Starts Here
120th Adjutant General Battalion - We Set the Example
369th Adjutant General Battalion - Army Pride

Airborne

XVIII Airborne Corps - Sky Dragons
82nd Airborne Division - "All the way! or Death from Above
101st Airborne Division - Rendezvous with Destiny
71st Airborne Brigade - Go Texans Go 
173rd Airborne Brigade - Sky Soldiers
82nd Airborne Division Artillery - Mass the Fire
101st Airborne Division Artillery - De Nubibus (From the Clouds)
Combat Aviation Brigade, 82nd Airborne Division - Wings of the Airborne
Combat Aviation Brigade, 101st Airborne Division - Wings of Destiny 
82nd Airborne Aviation Regiment - Ground Air Mobility
101st Airborne Aviation Regiment - Wings of the Eagle
16th Air Traffic Control Battalion - Voice to the Skies
29th Air Traffic Control Battalion - Vector to Victory
58th Air Traffic Control Battalion - Deconflict Lead the Way
59th Air Traffic Control Battalion - Voice of Control
125th Air Traffic Control Battalion - Voice of the Aviation
118th Military Police Company (ABN) - Heaven Sent, Hell Bent! The Mighty Mighty

Armored
1st Armored Division - Old Ironsides
2nd Armored Division  - Hell on Wheels
3rd Armored Division - Spearhead
13th Armored Division - It Shall Be Done
40th Armored Brigade - Old Hickory Volunteers
31st Armored Brigade - Dixie Brigade
32nd Armor Regiment - Victory or Death
33rd Armor Regiment - Men of War
35th Armor Regiment - Vincere Vel Mori (To Conquer or Die)
36th Brigade, 50th Armored Division - I'll Lead You (quotation attributed to John Bell Hood)
37th Armor Regiment - Courage Conquers
40th Armor Regiment - By Force and Valor
40th Armored Brigade - Armipotent (Mighty in Arms)
49th Armored Division - Lone Star
50th Armor - In Via (On the Way)
53rd Armor - Strength in Steel
64th Armor - We Pierce
68th Armor - Ventre A Terre (With Great Speed)
69th Armor - Vitesse et Puissance (Speed and Power)
70th Armor - Strike Swiftly
72nd Armor - Crusaders
77th Armor Regiment - Insiste Firmiter (Stand Firmly)
104th Cavalry Regiment - Over, Under, Or Through

Artillery
19th Field Artillery Regiment - 
319th Field Artillery Regiment - Loyalty
320th Field Artillery Regiment - 
321st Field Artillery Regiment - 
333rd Field Artillery Regiment - Three Rounds
377th Field Artillery Regiment - 
428th Field Artillery Brigade - Support Reinforce Defend
434th Field Artillery Brigade - Service with Pride
479th Field Artillery Brigade - Dependable Support
487th Field Artillery Regiment - Hiki Ni (Certainly, It Can Be Done)
512th Artillery Group - Valor About All
514th Artillery Group - Protect and Provide
528th Artillery Group - Monstrans Viam (Pointing the Way) 
548th Artillery Group - Reliable and Relentlessness
552nd Artillery Group - Mission and Teamwork
557th Artillery Group - Nihil Obstat (Nothing Stands in Our Way)
558th Artillery Group - Honor Guides Our Power
559th Artillery Group - Spina Frontis (Backbone of the Front)
570th Artillery Group - The Professionals
623rd Field Artillery Regiment - Seize the Opportunity
631st Field Artillery Brigade - Fast Competent Accurate

Aviation

Aviation Center of Excellence - Above The Best
1st Aviation Regiment - Super Primum
2d Aviation Regiment - Excelsus (Lofty)
3d Aviation Regiment - Ex Alis Pugnamus (We Fight on Wings)
4th Aviation Regiment - Vigilantia Aeterna (Eternal Vigilance)
5th Aviation Regiment - Acute and Alert
7th Aviation Battalion - Lucky Seven
8th Aviation Battalion - To the Sound of Guns
9th Aviation - Anytime Anywhere
10th Aviation Battalion - Soldiers of the Sky
110th Aviation Brigade (formerly 10th Aviation Group) - Will Do
11th Aviation Battalion - Exempla Proponere (To Set Forth Examples)
11th Aviation Group - We Make the Difference
12th Aviation Group - Ad Excelsum Conamur (Strive for Excellence)
13th Aviation Battalion - Swift and Deadly (formerly: Shield of the Mekong)
14th Aviation Battalion - Versatility
15th Aviation Group - Flying Mustangs
16th Aviation Battalion - Parati Respondere (Ready to Respond)
16th Aviation Group - Born in Battle
17th Aviation Brigade - Freedom's Eagles
18th Aviation Battalion -Swift Mobility
19th Aviation Battalion - Mobilitas (Mobility)
20th Aviation Battalion - Peak of Performance
21st Aviation Battalion - Peace and War
22d Aviation Battalion - Proud and Professional
24th Aviation - Ever Watchful
25th Aviation - Lele Makou No Ma Pauli (We Fly for the Troops)
28th Aviation - The Eye of an Eagle
29th Division - 29 Let's Go
31st Aviation Group - That We May Serve
32d Aviation Group - Talons of Victory
33d Aviation Brigade - Into Combat We Fly
33d Aviation Group - Pride Courage Valor
140th Aviation - Cura et Perfectio (Accuracy and Perfection)
45th Aviation Battalion - We Try Harder
46th Aviation Battalion - Over and Above
532d Aviation Battalion - Support Everywhere
55th Aviation Battalion - Wings of Victory

Infantry
U.S. Army Infantry School - Follow Me
1st Infantry Division - No Mission Too Difficult, No Sacrifice Too Great, Duty First
2nd Infantry Division - Second to None
3rd Infantry Division - 
4th Infantry Division - Steadfast and Loyal
7th Infantry Division - Light, Silent, and Deadly
10th Mountain Division - Climb to Glory
25th Infantry Division - Tropic Lightning
28th Infantry Division - Roll On
29th Infantry Division - 29 Let's Go
34th Infantry Division- ATTACK! ATTACK! ATTACK!
197th Infantry Brigade - Forever Forward!
198th Infantry Brigade - Brave and Bold
199th Infantry Brigade - Light, Swift, Accurate
1st Infantry Regiment - 
2nd Infantry Regiment - 
3rd Infantry Regiment - 
4th Infantry Regiment - 
5th Infantry Regiment - I'll Try, Sir
6th Infantry Regiment - Unity is Strength
7th Infantry Regiment - 
8th Infantry Regiment - 
9th Infantry Regiment - Keep Up The Fire!
10th Infantry Regiment - Courage and Fidelity
13th Infantry Regiment - Forty rounds
15th Infantry Regiment - Can do
17th Infantry Regiment - Truth and Courage
20th Infantry Regiment - To The Limit of Our Ability
75th Ranger Regiment - 
133rd Infantry Regiment - 
442nd Infantry Regiment - Go for broke
501st Infantry Regiment - Geronimo! 
502nd Infantry Regiment - Strike
503rd Infantry Regiment - The Rock
504th Infantry Regiment - Strike Hold
505th Infantry Regiment - H-Minus
506th Infantry Regiment - 
507th Parachute Infantry Regiment - Down to Earth
508th Infantry Regiment - Fury From the Sky
509th Infantry Regiment - All The Way

Other
 Explosive Ordnance Disposal - Initial Success or Total Failure
 Reconnaissance and Surveillance Leaders Course - In Orbe Terrum Non Visi

U.S. Marine Corps
Marine Corps Embassy Security Group - In Every Clime and Place
1st Marine Division - No Better Friend, No Worse Enemy
3rd Marine Division - Fidelity, Honor, Valor
1st Battalion, 4th Marines - Whatever It Takes

U.S. Navy
United States Navy - In 1992 the U.S. Navy officially adopted "Honor, Courage, Commitment" as their standing motto.
Naval Construction Forces (Seabees) - Construimus, Batuimus (We build, we fight)
Special Warfare Combatant Craft Crewmen 'On Time, On Target, Never Quit.'
Navy Supply Corps - Ready for Sea
Navy SEALs - "The only easy day was yesterday"
Navy divers - "We dive the world over"
United States Naval Academy  - Latin: Ex Scientia Tridens (From Knowledge, Seapower)

U.S. Air Force 

United States Air Force - Aim High... Fly, Fight, Win
Alaskan Air Command - Top Cover for America
Strategic Air Command - Peace is Our Profession
1st Special Operations Wing - Any Time, Any Place
1st Tactical Fighter Wing - Aut Vincere Aut Mori (Conquer or Die)
2d Bomb Wing - Libertatem Defendimus (Liberty We Defend)
4th Tactical Fighter Wing - Fourth But First
5th Bomb Wing - Kiai O Ka Lewa (Guardians of the Upper Realm)
6th Air Mobility Wing (formerly 6th Strategic Wing) - Parati Defendere (Ready to Defend)
7th Bomb Wing - Mors Ab Alto (Death From Above)
8th Tactical Fighter Wing - Attaquez et Conquerez (Attack and Conquer)
9th Strategic Reconnaissance Wing - Semper Paratus (Always Ready)
10th Tactical Reconnaissance Wing - Argus (Ceaseless Watch)
11th Air Refueling Wing - Progresso Sine Timore Aut Praejudicio (Progress without Fear or Prejudice)
12th Flying Training Wing - Spiritus Omnia Vincet (The Spirit Conquers All)
14th Flying Training Wing - Day and Night—Peace and War
15th Air Base Wing - None. From 1942 to 1992, the motto was Prosequor Alis (I Pursue with Wings). In December 1992, the Air Force Historical Research Agency approved the wing commander's request to delete the motto since it was no longer applicable to the unit's mission.
17th Bombardment Wing - Toujours Au Danger (Ever Into Danger)
18th Tactical Fighter Wing - Unguibus et Rostro (With Talons and Beak)
19th Airlift Wing (formerly 19th Bombardment Wing) - In Alis Vincimus (On Wings We Conquer)
20th Tactical Fighter Wing - Victory By Valor
21st Composite Wing - Fortitudo et Preparatio (Strength and Preparedness)
22d Air Refueling Wing (formerly 22d Bombardment Wing) - Ducemus (We Lead)
23d Tactical Fighter Wing - Flying Tigers: Gentle Paws—Sharp Claws
24th Special Operations Wing (formerly 24th Composite Wing) - Los Profesionales (The Professionals)
25th Tactical Reconnaissance Wing - Guard With Power
26th Tactical Reconnaissance Wing - Saber Es Poder (Knowledge is Power)
27th Special Operations Wing (formerly 27th Tactical Fighter Wing) - Intelligent Strength
28th Bombardment Wing - Guardian of the North
31st Tactical Fighter Wing - Return With Honor
33rd Tactical Fighter Wing - Fire From the Clouds
35th Tactical Fighter Wing - Attack to Defend
36th Tactical Fighter Wing - Prepared to Prevail
37th Tactical Fighter Wing - Defender of the Crossroads
38th Flying Training Wing - Valor With Progress
42d Air Base Wing (formerly 42d Bombardment Wing) - Aethera Nobis (The Skies for Us)
43d Strategic Wing - Willing, Able, Ready
44th Missile Wing (formerly 44th Strategic Missile Wing (ICBM—Minuteman)) - Aggressor Beware
46th Test Wing (formerly 46th Aerospace Defense Wing) - Support
48th Tactical Fighter Wing - Statue de La Liberte  (The Statue of Liberty)
49th Tactical Fighter Wing - Tutor et Ultor (I Protect and Avenge)
50th Tactical Fighter Wing - Master of the Sky
51st Fighter Wing (formerly 51st Tactical Fighter Wing) - Leading the Charge (1993–present); Deftly and Swiftly (former motto)
52d Tactical Fighter Wing - Seek, Attack, Destroy
55th Wing (formerly 55th Strategic Reconnaissance Wing) - Videmus Omnia (We See All)
56th Tactical Fighter Wing - Cave Tonitrum (Beware of the Thunderbolt)
58th Tactical Training Wing - Non Revertar Inultus (I Will Not Return Unavenged)
63d Military Airlift Wing - Omnia Ubique Semper (Anything, Anywhere, Anytime)
66th Tactical Reconnaissance Wing - Omnia Conspicimus (We Observe All)
67th Tactical Reconnaissance Wing - Lux ex Tenebris (Light from Darkness)
68th Bombardment Wing - Follow Me
70th Bombardment Wing - Strength Through Unity
75th Tactical Reconnaissance Wing - Apperceptive
76th Military Airlift Wing - Our Observation, Your Security
78th Flying Training Wing - Above the Foe
80th Flying Training Wing - Angels on Our Wings
81st Tactical Fighter Wing - Le Nom Les Armes La Loyaute (The Name, the Arms, and Loyalty)
82d Flying Training Wing - Adorimuini - Up and at 'em!
84th Combat Sustainment Wing (formerly 84th Fighter-All Weather Wing) - Cursum Perfico (I Accomplish My Course)
86th Tactical Fighter Wing - Virtus Perdurat (Courage Will Endure)
89th Airlift Wing - Experto Crede (Trust One Who Has Had Experience)
90th Missile Wing - Impavide (Undauntedly)
91st Missile Wing - Poised for Peace
92d Air Refueling Wing (formerly 92d Bombardment Wing) - Duplum Incolumitatis (Twofold Security)
94th Airlift Wing - Minuteman Wing
95th Strategic Wing - Justice with Victory
96th Test Wing (formerly 96th Bombardment Wing) - E Sempre L'ora (It is Always the Hour)
97th Air Mobility Wing (formerly 97th Bombardment Wing - Venit Hora (The Hour Has Come)
98th Strategic Wing - Force for Freedom
99th Bombardment Wing - Caveant Aggressores (Let Aggressors Beware)
100th Air Refueling Wing - Peace Through Strength
146th Airlift Wing - The Hollywood Guard
301st Air Refueling Wing - Who Fears?
302d Airlift Wing (formerly 302d Tactical Airlift Wing) - Justem et Tenacem (Just and Resolute)
303d Aeronautical Systems Wing (formerly 303d Bombardment Wing) - Might in Flight
305th Air Mobility Wing (formerly 305th Air Refueling Wing) - Can Do
582d Air Resupply and Communications Wing - Libertas Per Veritatem (Freedom Through Truth)
306th Strategic Wing - Abundance of Strength
308th Armament Systems Wing - Non Sibi Sed Aliis (Not for Self, But for Others)
316th Tactical Airlift Wing - Valor Without Arms

317th Tactical Airlift Wing - I Gain By Hazard
319th Air Base Wing (formerly 319th Bombardment Wing) - Defensores Libertatis (Defenders of Freedom)
320th Air Expeditionary Wing (formerly 320th Bombardment Wing) - Strength Through Awareness

U.S. Space Force 

 United States Space Force - 
 Space Training and Readiness Delta (Provisional) – 
 Space Delta 2 – Sentinels
 Space Delta 4 – 
 Space Delta 9 – Stormbringers

U.S. Coast Guard 

 United States Coast Guard -  (The Latin motto is also the name of the USCG service song, 'Semper Paratus' composed in 1927).

National Guard
National Guard of the United States: Always Ready, Always There
District of Columbia Army National Guard - Capital Guardians
Florida Army National Guard - We Accept the Challenge
Hawaii Army National Guard - Onipaa Mau Loa (Steadfast Forever)
Maine Army National Guard - Dirigo (I Direct or I Guide) (also the state motto)
Maryland Army National Guard - Fatti Maschi Parole Femine (also the state motto)
Massachusetts Army National Guard - Ense Petit Placidam (also the state motto)
Michigan Army National Guard - With Honor We Serve
Missouri Army National Guard - Protectors of Peace
North Carolina Army National Guard - Always Ready, Ready Team
North Carolina Army National Guard - 30th Brigade Combat Team, (Formerly 30th Infantry)Old Hickory
 Vermont National Guard - Put the Vermonters Ahead - from General John Sedgwick's order on the road to Gettysburg

References

Military mottos
United States military traditions